Adidas Silverstone Half Marathon is a road half marathon that was held each year on the Silverstone Circuit between 2003 and 2017, usually in March. The race did not occur in 2018. It will occur on November 24, 2019 organised by The Race Organiser Ltd. It was sponsored by Adidas, and was known as the Adidas Silverstone  Half Marathon.

Recent winners

Table of recent winners.

References

External links
Official Site
Silverstone Circuit
Silverstone Hotels

Sport in Northamptonshire
Half marathons in the United Kingdom
Recurring sporting events established in 2003
2003 establishments in England